Bacchisa aulica is a species of beetle in the family Cerambycidae. It was described by Pascoe in 1867. It is known from Sulawesi.

Varietas
 Bacchisa aulica var. nigrodiscalis Breuning
 Bacchisa aulica var. simia (Pascoe, 1867)

References

A
Beetles described in 1867